delfort is a privately owned manufacturer of specialty paper and printed products with headquarters in Traun, Upper Austria. As of 2016, the company employs over 2,300 employees worldwide and operates six mills in Europe and Asia, three converting plants in the US and Mexico, and six sales offices.

Global operations
delfort operates nine subsidiaries across Europe, Asia and the Americas (as of June 2016), manufacturing and converting specialty papers for a number of applications.

delfort’s production sites include:
 Delfortgroup printing services
 Dr. Franz Feurstein 
 Dunafin Kft. 
 Mundet (USA & Mexico)
 OP Papírna 
 Tervakoski Oy 
 Wattens Vietnam 
 Wattenspapier

In 2016, the company employed around 2,300 people and sold over 9,476 km² of paper in the year 2015. The group's CEO is Martin Zahlbruckner and the CFO and COO is Roland Faihs.

Specialty Paper and Printing
delfort makes papers for the food and packaging industry, plugwrap, cigarette and tipping base papers for the tobacco industry, base paper for industrial labels, leaflets for the pharmaceutical industry and thinprint papers for religious literature, catalogue and scientific printing, printed products and other specialties.

References

Papermakers
Manufacturing companies of Austria
Economy of Upper Austria